Chak 10/1.A.L (Urdu: چک نمبر 10 ون اے ايل) is a village in Okara District located almost 13.1 kilometer from Renala Khurd.

History 
It is near Akhtar Abad. Previously which was called Dhuni Wala. When British established the water canal channel to this area they divided the area according to the water availability, the name 10/1.A.L. actually refers to 10th Drain.

See also 
 Renala Khurd

Villages in Okara District